is a Japanese retired badminton player who affiliates with Hokuto Bank team. She was the bronze medalists at the 2018 World Championships in the women's doubles, and at the 2015 Summer Universiade in the women's singles. She won the year-end tournament Superseries Finals in 2017. Tanaka was part of Japanese winning team at the 2017 Asia Mixed Team Championships, 2018 Uber Cup, and at the 2018 Asia Women's Team Championships.

Career 
In 2011, she won Osaka International tournament in women's doubles event with her partner Miri Ichimaru. In 2012, she participated at the World University Badminton Championships and won the women's doubles event after beating Chinese Taipei pairs Tai Tzu-ying and Pai Hsiao-ma 22–20, 21–11. In 2015, she became the runner-up of Chinese Taipei Masters tournament partnered with Koharu Yonemoto. In 2016, she won the US Open, and became the runner-up of Vietnam International tournaments.

Tanaka announced her retirement from the badminton tournament at the press conference in the Akita Prefectural office on 29 January 2021. She will continue her career in badminton as a coach in the Hokuto Bank.

Achievements

BWF World Championships 
Women's doubles

Summer Universiade 
Women's singles

BWF World Tour (1 title, 1 runner-up) 
The BWF World Tour, which was announced on 19 March 2017 and implemented in 2018, is a series of elite badminton tournaments sanctioned by the Badminton World Federation (BWF). The BWF World Tours are divided into levels of World Tour Finals, Super 1000, Super 750, Super 500, Super 300 (part of the HSBC World Tour), and the BWF Tour Super 100.

Women's doubles

BWF Superseries 
The BWF Superseries, which was launched on 14 December 2006 and implemented in 2007, is a series of elite badminton tournaments, sanctioned by the Badminton World Federation (BWF). BWF Superseries levels are Superseries and Superseries Premier. A season of Superseries consists of twelve tournaments around the world that have been introduced since 2011. Successful players are invited to the Superseries Finals, which are held at the end of each year.

Women's doubles

  BWF Superseries Finals tournament
  BWF Superseries Premier tournament
  BWF Superseries tournament

BWF Grand Prix 
The BWF Grand Prix had two levels, the Grand Prix and Grand Prix Gold. It was a series of badminton tournaments sanctioned by the Badminton World Federation (BWF) and played between 2007 and 2017.

Women's doubles

  BWF Grand Prix Gold tournament
  BWF Grand Prix tournament

BWF International Challenge/Series 
Women's doubles

  BWF International Challenge tournament
  BWF International Series tournament
  BWF Future Series tournament

References

External links 
 

1992 births
Living people
Sportspeople from Kumamoto Prefecture
Japanese female badminton players
Universiade bronze medalists for Japan
Universiade medalists in badminton
Medalists at the 2015 Summer Universiade